Ethmia hiramella is a moth in the family Depressariidae. It is found in Cuba.

The ground color of the forewings is white or pale cream-white, with brownish black markings reflecting metallic greenish blue. The ground color of the hindwings is semitranslucent white basally, becoming opaque ocherous on the distal half and brownish at the apex. Adults are on wing in April, June and October.

References

Moths described in 1914
hiramella
Endemic fauna of Cuba